Kame Island is an island  east of Cape Ryugu, lying close to the shore of Queen Maud Land, Antarctica. It was mapped from surveys and air photos by the Japanese Antarctic Research Expedition, 1957–62, and named Kameshima (turtle island) because of its shape.

See also 
 List of antarctic and sub-antarctic islands

References

Islands of Queen Maud Land
Prince Olav Coast